Choppee Creek is a stream in the U.S. state of South Carolina.

According to tradition, Choppee Creek is named after an Indian tribe. A variant name is "Chopper Creek".

References

Rivers of South Carolina
Rivers of Georgetown County, South Carolina